is a carbonaceous, Themistian asteroid from the outer region of the asteroid belt, about 10 kilometers in diameter. It was discovered on 21 March 1993, by the Uppsala-ESO Survey of Asteroids and Comets (UESAC) at ESO's La Silla Observatory site in northern Chile.

Classification and orbit 

The dark C-type asteroid is a member of the Themis family, a dynamical family of outer-belt asteroids with nearly coplanar ecliptical orbits. It orbits the Sun in the outer main-belt at a distance of 2.8–3.4 AU once every 5 years and 5 months (1,987 days). Its orbit has an eccentricity of 0.11 and an inclination of 1° with respect to the ecliptic.

Physical characteristics

Lightcurves 

In 2014, two rotational lightcurves of this asteroid were obtained from photometric observations in the R-band at the U.S. Palomar Transient Factory in California. Lightcurve analysis gave a rotation period of 3.4735 and 3.470 hours with a brightness variation of 0.10 and 0.13 in magnitude, respectively.

Diameter and albedo 

The Collaborative Asteroid Lightcurve Link (CALL) assumes a low albedo of 0.08 for the asteroid's surface and calculates a diameter of 9.9 kilometers, based on an absolute magnitude of 13.38.

Naming 

As of 2017, the asteroid has not been named.

References

External links 
 Asteroid Lightcurve Database (LCDB), query form (info )
 Dictionary of Minor Planet Names, Google books
 Asteroids and comets rotation curves, CdR – Observatoire de Genève, Raoul Behrend
 Discovery Circumstances: Numbered Minor Planets (5001)-(10000) – Minor Planet Center
 
 

007348
007348
19930321